The 1935 Haskell Indians football team was an American football that represented the Haskell Institute—now known as Haskell Indian Nations University—as an independent during the 1935 college football season. The team compiled a record of 0–7–1, failed to score a point in five of its eight games, and was outscored by a total of 166 to 37.

In August 1935, following the departure of Gus Welch, John Levi was named as the head coach of Haskell's football, basketball, and track teams. Levi, a full-blooded Arapaho, had been a star athlete at Haskell, winning 16 varsity letters from 1921 to 1924.

Schedule

References

Haskell
Haskell Indian Nations Fighting Indians football seasons
College football winless seasons
Haskell Indians football